Harry Woolston Shipps (January 28, 1926 – November 17, 2016) was the eighth Bishop of Georgia. He was the 778th bishop of the Episcopal Church in the United States of America (ECUSA).

Early life and career
Shipps was born in Bordentown, New Jersey and graduated in 1942 from William MacFarland High School. In 1946 Shipps graduated from the New York State Maritime Academy.

Commissioned as an officer in the United States Navy, Lt. Shipps sailed on a troop ship, and after his discharged sailed with the Grace Line Steamship Company. He was recalled to active duty during the Korean War and assigned to a naval facility in Savannah, Georgia, but later sailed on ships in the North Atlantic. On May 16, 1953, he married Louise Huntington Rosenberger.

Ministry
After his military discharge, Shipps attended the School of Theology at The University of the South and received his B.D. degree there in 1958. That same year, on May 20, he was ordained as a transitional deacon by Bishop Albert R. Stuart. He was ordained to the priesthood on January 17, 1959, by Bishop Alfred L. Banyard. Shipps served in parish ministry in Albany, Savannah and Augusta, Georgia.

He also served the Episcopal Diocese of Georgia, before his election as Bishop, as diocesan secretary, editor of the diocesan newspaper, on diocesan council, member and president of the standing committee and as a deputy to three General Conventions. He was the Dean of the Augusta Convocation at the time of his election. Shipps was elected bishop coadjutor on September 15, 1983, on 11th round of balloting from a field of 35 nominees.

Episcopacy
Shipps was consecrated as the eighth Bishop of Georgia. He had been elected as a bishop coadjutor to succeed Paul Reeves on Reeve's retirement. Shipps served as diocesan bishop from 1985 through 1995. During Shipps' tenure as diocesan bishop, the Diocese made headlines when a former Assembly of God minister, Stan White, lead his independent congregation to join the Episcopal Church en masse and as Christ the King Church, Valdosta, became a congregation in the Episcopal Diocese of Georgia. During his episcopacy, women were first ordained in the Diocese of Georgia. He was succeeded by Henry I. Louttit.

Shipps died on November 17, 2016.

References

Sources
Episcopal Church Service article on Shipps' election
Mine Eyes Have Seen the Glory
 Augusta Chronica article on Shipps' election

1926 births
2016 deaths
Bordentown Regional High School alumni
People from Burlington County, New Jersey
People from Georgia (U.S. state)
People from Trenton, New Jersey
Sewanee: The University of the South alumni
20th-century American Episcopalians
Episcopal bishops of Georgia